Alberto Pineda Martinez (born April 19, 1961), is a Filipino actor, director, producer and baker.

Early life
He was born in Manila on April 19, 1961 to Bert Martinez, and Margarita Pineda.

Career
Martinez began as a film actor. He took his first teleserye role as Glenn in the 1980 series Anna Liza on GMA Network. Martinez's character, Glenn was the suitor of the titular protagonist, Anna Liza which was portrayed by Julie Vega.

Martinez cites actor John Travolta's acting style as his basis on his own film roles. He describes Travolta as having a tongue-in-cheek style in acting as characterized in his roles in Face/Off, Broken Arrow and Battlefield Earth. Martinez praised Travolta for making his roles "shine" on the aforementioned films despite not portraying "natural characters". He also cited Christopher de Leon as his idol since he started his career in film acting.

In 1992, after taking a break from acting to raise his two children with Anna Lissa "Liezl" Sumilang in the United States, Martinez starred in the romantic drama film Yakapin Mo Akong Muli, which was a box office bomb.

In the television series Ikaw Lang ang Mamahalin, he portrayed Ferdinand Fuentebuella who marries a woman from a rich family to save the wealth of his own family. On the eve of Martinez's character's wedding, Fuentebuella had a one-night stand with a prostitute (portrayed by Gina Alajar and gets her pregnant. Fuentebuella is reunited with his daughter, Catherine (portrayed by Angelika dela Cruz) five years later but again gets separated from each other. Throughout the series Fuentebuella is determined to reunite again with his daughter as his loveless marriage deteriorates. This role of a sympathetic character was deemed a deviation from Martinez's usual portrayal of hateful characters in films. Commenting on his role after being asked how does he chooses his role, Martinez says that the audience views the characters as role models which they would like to emulate. He says that he tries to incorporate positive values in his role yet he makes sure that the character he portrays remains flawed adding that he is "always looking for a dark twist".

Martinez starred as a downtrodden husband in the 2003 film Magnífico. He starred in the television series, Sa Piling Mo, together with Judy Ann Santos and Piolo Pascual which was shown on ABS-CBN. He also worked on the teleserye Maria Flordeluna in 2007 as the role of Gen. Leo Alicante. In 2009–2010, he worked on the teleserye May Bukas Pa, in the role of the antagonist turned protagonist Mayor Enrique Rodrigo. He played the role of Frank Crisanto on the teleserye Kung Tayo'y Magkakalayo, alongside Kris Aquino, Kim Chiu, Gina Pareño, Coco Martin, and Gerald Anderson.

He directed the film Rosario which was shown at the 2010 Metro Manila Film Festival.

Martinez was part of cast for the 2012 film, Born to Love You. His next major appearance in a feature film would be in the 2021 adult drama film The Housemaid, although he also figured in a special role in Revirginized which starred Sharon Cuneta.

In 2021, he returns to GMA-7 as part of Las Hermanas.

In 2022, he returns to ABS-CBN as part of a new action series titled The Iron Heart starring Richard Gutierrez

Personal life
His father, Bert Martínez, was a character actor during the 1960s. Albert was married to Liezl Sumilang from 1985, until her death in 2015. In the late 1980s, the couple owned up to 46 massage therapy clinics throughout California in the United States. They had three children: actor Alfonso Martinez, William Martínez and Ronnie Martinez.

Filmography

Film

As director
Rosario (2010) – MMFF Entry "59th Famas Best Director (winner)"

Television

Footnotes

Awards and nominations

References

External links

GMA Network profile

1961 births
Living people
20th-century Filipino male actors
21st-century Filipino male actors
Filipino film producers
Filipino male comedians
Filipino male film actors
Filipino male television actors
Filipino people of American descent
Filipino people of Spanish descent
Filipino television personalities
Male actors from Cebu
Albert
People from Cebu City
GMA Network personalities
ABS-CBN personalities